Viscount  was a Japanese admiral in the early Imperial Japanese Navy, and served as Navy Minister in the late 19th century.

Biography
Nire was born in Kagoshima, Satsuma domain, what is now Kagoshima Prefecture to a samurai family. As a samurai youth, he participated in the Anglo-Satsuma War. In 1867, by order of the clan, he went to the United States to study. Following the Meiji Restoration, he joined the new Meiji government and served in various staff positions pertaining to naval matters. He served as a crewman on the frigate Kasuga from November 1873 to June 1874.

Nire was commissioned as a captain in June 1874. From December 1875 to March 1877, he was naval attaché to Pusan, Korea. From April 1878 to February 1880, he was Commandant of the Imperial Japanese Naval Academy. Promoted to rear admiral on 4 February 1880, he was subsequently commandant of the Naval Engineering Academy and the Bureau of Naval Affairs. On 7 July 1884, he was ennobled with the title of viscount (shishaku) under the kazoku peerage system.

Nire was promoted to vice admiral 29 June 1885. He became commander in chief of the Yokosuka Naval District in March 1889, and from June 1891 to August 1892 was commandant of the Naval Staff College. 

From 8 August 1892 to 11 March 1893, Nire served as Naval Minister in the 2nd cabinet of Prime Minister Itō Hirobumi, where he made efforts to increase naval budgets and to build the strength of the navy for what he perceived to be a growing possibility of war with China. 

Nire went into the reserves in 1893. He subsequently served on the Privy Council, and died in 1900. His grave is at Aoyama Cemetery in Tokyo. His daughter Haruko was the wife of Prime Minister Saitō Makoto. His son, Nire Kageo, was a noted entomologist who wrote numerous scientific texts on the insects of the Korean peninsula and Taiwan.

References

Books

External links

 National Diet Library Biography

Notes

  

1831 births
1900 deaths
Imperial Japanese Navy admirals
People from Satsuma Domain
Ministers of the Imperial Japanese Navy
People of Meiji-period Japan
Samurai
Kazoku
Shimazu retainers
People from Kagoshima